Víctor Cordero Aurrecoechea (10 October 1914 – 7 December 1983) was a Mexican composer, who was born and died in Mexico City. Many of his compositions were used in Mexican films, and Mexican singers like Pedro Infante and Jorge Negrete were interpreters of Corderoʻs songs.

Compositions 
Corderoʻs compositions were used in more than 70 Mexican films. A few of his notable compositions include:
Juan Charrasqueado
El loco
Gabino Barrera
El ojo de vidrio
Besos callejeros (in the film The Place Without Limits)
Flor triste
Domingo Corrales

Family 
Víctor Cordero was a son of Don Rafael Cordero and his wife, Rosario Aurrecoechea Jiménez, and thus a brother of the actor Joaquín Cordero Aurrecoechea. Son of Víctor is José Luis Cordero, who is a singer and actor.

References 

Mexican male composers
1914 births
1983 deaths
20th-century male musicians